The Corteo Storico is a historical costume parade in Siena, Tuscany, Italy. It takes place before the famous horse race known as the Palio on the 2nd of July and on August 16, each year.

Description 

The parade has always occurred before the Palio since the race's inception. It is a formally choreographed triumphal march that commemorates the ancient institutions, customs and greatness of the Republic of Siena. Special attention is given to the Contrade whose participants form the main part of the parade. The parade takes place in the Piazza del Campo with 14 groups and a total of almost seven hundred participants.

In the early afternoon, on the day of the Palio, members of the town gather in the courtyard of the Palace of Justice and under the command of the field marshal, line-up in Piazza del Duomo next to the cathedral. They parade between the crowd on both sides of the streets called: Via del Capitano, Piazza Postierla, Via San Pietro, Via del Casato di Sopra and Via del Casato di Sotto where they join the other members of the parade.

The procession enters the Piazza del Campo on the first toll of the bell (the "Sunto") on the Torre del Mangia.

Seventeen pairs of flag-bearers stop at the various points in the Piazza and in synchrony with the drum roll perform a spectacular flag-waving exhibition culminating with the throwing of the flag at the end.

The parade marches to the "passo della Diana" ("passo" means step), the musicians of Palazzo play the march of the Palio of the maestro Formichi  while the city trumpeters play on silver trumpets.

The central focus of the procession is the passing of the Carroccio, the modern counterpart of the Republic's ancient triumphal chariot on which the silken colourful Palio banner is hoisted.

After circling the square, the parade members take their places. The Palio is hoisted on to the judges stand while the seventeen flag-bearers perform their own drum roll, "la sbandierata della Vittoria" (the flag-waving of Victory), so called because it was introduced at the end of World War I.

Composition of the Parade
The parade starts with 6 Mazzieri (Pole-bearers).
A Horse follows the standard-bearer on the "Balzana" icon accompanied by four of Siena's commanders.
Then the musicians of Palazzo advance, preceded by drums and silver trumpets that set the pace of the procession.
These are followed by the insignia of the city, "potesteria", that represent the lands and castles of the ancient Sienese state above the standard-bearers and their replacements from the municipality of Massa Marittima and the municipality of Montalcino, which guard this historical privilege.
The captain of the people rides with a page, preceded by a standard-bearer, 3 dagger bearing pages, with helmets and swords, followed by 3 gonfaloniers, the "Terzi" on horseback, and three centurions of "Masse dei Terzi", also on horseback, all accompanied by grooms.
In the next group is represents the Studio Senese (Senese means from Siena), it includes two drummers, a standard-bearer, a rector, four teachers and four students.
The standard-bearer and 3 of the Magistrates Merchandise preceded by two drummers followed by six representatives of each Contrada preceded by a standard-bearer who rears the banner of each of the guilds of each Contrada:
Tailors Valdimontone (Valley of the Ram),
Pharmacists Pantera (Panther),
Sculptors Tartuca (Tortoise),
Weavers Selva (Forest),
Dye makers Oca (Goose),
Bankers Drago (Dragon),
Potters Nicchio (Seashell),
Goldsmiths Leocorno (Unicorn),
Notaries Aquila (Eagle),
Silk Makers Bruco (Caterpillar),
Cobblers Civetta (Little Owl),
Wool makers Torre (Tower),
Painters Giraffa (Giraffe),
Carpenters Onda (Wave),
Bakers Lupa (She-Wolf),
Tanners Chiocciola (Snail),
Smiths Istrice (Crested Porcupine).
A page bearing the "Masgalano" (prize for the best "pop") with two pages following.
Contrada parade of the ten in the race. Each appearance is as follows: a drummer, two bishops, the "Duce" escorted by two armed men, then more pages holding the banner of the Contrada flanked by two pages bearing the flags of the military companies. On a large horse (called the "soprallasso") escorted by a groom, is the jockey in ceremonial dress, followed the horse which is racing. Contradas participating in the Palio enter the order determined by the drawn lots.
A double row of six little pages bearing the symbolic garlands, form division with the Contrade excluded from this Palio.
The appearance of the 7 Contrade not participating consist of the following elements: the drummer, two bishops, a leader escorted by two soldiers, Major page and Banner Carrier with two pages bearing the flags of the old military companies.
This is followed by six knights pages, representatives Contradas which no longer exist (Gallo, Lion, Bear, Oak, Spadaforte, Viper).
20 archers preceded by a page flag holder by the Captain, 2 and 4 drummers.
Following these the Captain of Justice with a horse and Page, escorted by four armed soldiers.
The procession is closed by the Carroccio (cart) pulled by four oxen. on the Carroccio are the Balia, the bearer of the  Palio, a valet who plays the "Martinella" and 6 trumpeters.
The Carroccio is accompanied by eight soldiers armed with Roncone and is followed by six knights representing many old noble families of Siena: Pannocchieschi d'Elci, Piccolomini, Salimbeni, Salvani, Tolomei, Ugurgieri .
The historical procession ends with six pages bearing a laurel wreath.

Gallery

References 
Corteo storico (Palio di Siena) (Wikipedia in Italian)
 Alan Dundes, Alessandro Falassi. La terra in Piazza: an interpretation of the Palio of Siena. Berkeley, University of California Press, 1975. 
 Alan Dundes, Alessandro Falassi, foto di Gigi Lusini. La terra in piazza. Antropologia del Palio, trad. italiana. Siena, Nuova Immagine Editrice, 2005.

External links
 YouTube video showing the Corteo Storico for Palio Di Siena on 2 July 2007
 YouTube video showing the  Carroccio for PALIO DI SIENA 2 July 2007
 YouTube video showing the start of the parade from via San Pietro towards The Piazza del Campo - 2 July 2007
 www.jacopodellatorre.com information on how to best follow the Historical Parade

Siena
Italian traditions
Festivals in Italy
Tourist attractions in Tuscany